The Edison Local School District is a public school district based in the community of Hammondsville, Ohio, United States.

The district serves the villages of Amsterdam, Bergholz, Empire, Irondale, Richmond, and Stratton as well as unincorporated areas in northern Jefferson County.

Schools
Edison High School (grades 7 - 12)
John Gregg Elementary School (pre-school - grade 6)
Stanton Elementary School (pre-school - grade 6)

See also
List of school districts in Ohio

External links
Edison Local School District official web site.

School districts in Ohio
Education in Jefferson County, Ohio